DNA profiling or genetic profiling  mainly refers to DNA profiling in forensics.

Also, DNA profiling or genetic profiling may refer to various techniques in medicine, such as:
Tests in medical genetics
Preimplantation genetic diagnosis

See also
Full genome sequencing